Seppo Vilderson (born 7 February 1963) is a retired Estonian professional football (soccer) player. He played for several clubs, including FC Norma Tallinn (1981–1990).

International career
Vilderson earned his first and only official cap for the Estonia national football team on 5 September 1993, when Estonia played Portugal in a World Cup Qualifier. He came up as a substitute for Martin Reim after 71 minutes. Vilderson also played in Finland during his career.

References

1963 births
Living people
Footballers from Tallinn
Estonian footballers
Estonia international footballers
Association football midfielders
FC Norma Tallinn players
Estonian expatriate footballers
Estonian expatriate sportspeople in Finland
Expatriate footballers in Finland